is a Japanese composer and arranger. Much of her work is for video games and anime.

Biography 
Iuchi was born in Hiroshima. She learned piano and percussion from a young age. As a high school student, she performed as a drummer in various bands. She graduated from the music design program at the Kunitachi College of Music and began her career working for video game hardware and software company SNK. In 2002, she left SNK to work for music production group I've as an outsource affiliate. In 2013 she became a full time employee at I've. In 2017 she retired from her full time position at the company but remained as a partner.

As a composer, she has written music for many video games and anime series including the A Certain Magical Index series, A Certain Scientific Railgun series, WIXOSS series, and Rewrite.

Discography

Game works

Anime works

References

External links
 
 Maiko Iuchi's I've Sound Profile
 Discography at VGMdb
 

Anime composers
Japanese composers
Japanese women composers
Japanese women musicians
Japanese music arrangers
Living people
Video game composers
Musicians from Hiroshima
Year of birth missing (living people)